Zaouiat Cheikh is a town in Béni-Mellal Province, Béni Mellal-Khénifra, Morocco. According to the 2004 census it has a population of 22,728.

References

Populated places in Béni Mellal Province
Municipalities of Morocco